Moving Pictures is a fantasy novel by British writer Terry Pratchett, published in 1990,  the tenth book in his Discworld series. The book takes place in Discworld's most famous city, Ankh-Morpork and a hill called "Holy Wood".

Plot
The alchemists of the Discworld have invented moving pictures. Many hopefuls are drawn by the siren call of Holy Wood, home of the fledgling "clicks" industry – among them Victor Tugelbend, a dropout from Ankh-Morpork's Unseen University and Theda "Ginger" Withel, a girl "from a little town you never ever heard of", and the Discworld's most infamous salesman, Cut-Me-Own-Throat Dibbler, who introduces commerce to the equation and becomes a successful producer. The business of making movies grows rapidly, and eventually Victor and Ginger become real stars, thanks to the help of Gaspode the sentient dog (who also develops a manager-client relationship with Laddie, who everybody considers to be the real Wonder Dog, although in fact is very simple-minded). Holy Wood for a while becomes an effervescent place full of humans, dwarfs, alchemists, demons (which essentially constitute the main technological device to make movies), and trolls (among whom is Detritus) all living in harmony.

Meanwhile, it gradually becomes clear that the production of movies is having a deleterious effect on the structure of reality. Ginger is possessed by an unspecified entity and she and Victor find an ancient, hidden cinema, complete with portal to the Dungeon Dimensions. Back in Ankh-Morpork, during the first screening of Blown Away (a parody of Gone with the Wind) which the senior wizards of the Unseen University are also attending, a creature from the Dungeon Dimensions breaks through. Victor fights it (in what eventually becomes a parody of the movie King Kong also featuring the Librarian of the Unseen University), having discovered that he could exploit Holy Wood magic and the narrative conventions of the clicks if he had a camera pointing at him. However, after the creature is defeated, Victor and the Librarian realise that the creatures will still try to get through from the Dungeon Dimensions and that Ginger in her possessed state was not trying to summon them but trying to keep them from coming through (possibly as a result of being descended from the High Priestess of Holy Wood). Returning to the ancient cinema at Holy Wood, Victor and Ginger witness a golden statue of a warrior (reminiscent of an Oscar) come to life and travel through the screen to defeat the creatures.

In the end most things return to normal (also because the Patrician and the wizards make it clear that they will not allow any more movies to be produced ever again), although dwarfs find themselves inexplicably singing "Hihohiho" while mining. Victor and Ginger have a last dialogue over the meaning of Holy Wood and being famous, and Gaspode and the other animals under the influence of Holy Wood lose their ability to reason and speak. The ending lines depict a poetic scene about the fragility of Holy Wood dreams.

Characters

Cut-me-own-Throat Dibbler
Thomas Silverfish
Victor Tugelbend aka Victor Maraschino
Detritus
Ruby
Gaspode
Theda Withel aka Ginger aka Delores de Syn
Oswald, a parody of the Academy Award of Merit, also referenced as Osric and Osbert

See also

 List of actors from Discworld

References

External links

 
 Annotations for Moving Pictures
 Quotes from Moving Pictures
 Synopsis of Moving Pictures

1990 British novels
Discworld books
1990 fantasy novels
Victor Gollancz Ltd books
Fiction about filmmaking
British comedy novels